Kidstreet is a Canadian children's game show that aired from 1987 to 1992 and was hosted by Kevin Frank, with Kathy Morse as the announcer (one of the rare occasions of a woman holding this position; the pair also worked together on The Next Line, which was in production at the same time as Kidstreet during its last season in 1991-92), who also worked as associate producer.

Kidstreet was produced by Blair Murdoch at CFAC/CKKX in Calgary and aired on the CanWest Global and WIC in Canada, with reruns later airing on America One in the United States. In the final season, production moved to U.TV in Vancouver, where Frank simultaneously hosted The Next Line. Kidstreet, produced by Northstar Syndications, later Blair Murdoch Productions, was one of Murdoch's longest running game shows, airing new episodes for 5 seasons.

Gameplay
Three teams of two kids each (all siblings) sat in race cars and competed in a game where they find out how much they know about each other while trying to win prizes. Correct answers were always followed by overhead clapping, which became a trademark of the show.

In the 2020 documentary series The Search for Canada's Game Shows, host Kevin Frank revealed that the overhead clapping came about when a sound operator angrily told everyone on set that normal clapping into the microphones ruined his sound mix and suggested the players clap above their heads from then on.

The Main game

Round 1 (Lap 1)
One set of kid players dubbed the drivers were sent off stage while their sibling whom are dubbed passengers answered two or three Newlywed Game-esque questions posed by host Frank. The answers given by the passengers act as predictions because when the drivers return they were asked the same questions. Each time the team's answers match, they earn 1 point. Those points were shown on eggcrate displays behind the contestants in the back of the cars (Kidstreet was the only show in Canada to use this type of display; most other shows in Canada used a variation on the Ferranti font while most of Blair Murdoch's other shows used the Vane font). After the round, Frank would interview the contestants.

Round 2 (Lap 2)
This lap/round was played like the first lap/round but with two differences:
 The roles are reversed meaning the drivers became the passengers and the passengers became the drivers.
 Each match was now worth 3 points.

The Final Lap
This works like the 25-point bonus question on The Newlywed Game, for in this round the roles were back to the way they were in round one.  The passengers were asked one final question worth 5 points if the drivers can match the answers. The team with the most points at the end of this round wins the game. A perfect score (meaning all answers in each round were matched successfully) would be 17 points. The other two teams would receive parting gifts such as Kidstreet t-shirts, Rucanor sneakers (which host Frank wore on the show), Kidstreet watches, Toys & Wheels gift certificates, a goodies bag, which included Coca-Cola, amongst other things, and a home game version of the show. In the event of a tie, a tie-breaker was played in the same way as a high-low question on Card Sharks to determine the winner, while the team that lost would be invited back to compete again on a future episode.

Kidstreet Rebus
The winning team now had a chance to solve a bonus puzzle called the "Kidstreet Rebus" (similar to the game show Concentration). They faced a grid of 25 numbered squares. To start squares were revealed at the outset; the number of squares revealed was determined by how many points the winning team scored during the game (if the team achieved a perfect score of 17 points, then all 25 squares would be revealed). Then the team chooses five more squares to reveal, and were given 20 seconds to solve it (the clock was displayed in the form of a "gas gauge" that went down as the seconds passed). If successful, they win a grand prize package. If they don't when time runs out, they have 10 more seconds to solve it (with the audience's help). If they solve it this time, the clock stops, and the team wins up to 10 smaller prizes, depending on the remaining time.

The winners would then have a chance to gather prizes from a mass of toys assembled at the side of the stage. Typically sponsored by Toys and Wheels, the mass would feature teddy bears, cars and other toys.

Canadian children's game shows
Global Television Network original programming
1987 Canadian television series debuts
1992 Canadian television series endings
Television series about children
Television series by Corus Entertainment
Television series by Blair Murdoch Productions
English-language television shows
Television shows filmed in Calgary
Television shows filmed in Vancouver
1980s Canadian game shows
1990s Canadian game shows
1980s Canadian children's television series
1990s Canadian children's television series